The Fujifilm FinePix XP-series of digital cameras consists of the company's tough, waterproof and lightweight point-and-shoot digital cameras.  All XP-series cameras feature some degree of waterproofing and shockproofing which varies from model to model.  The range began in 2009 with the launch of the Fujifilm FinePix XP10. A few of the models (FinePix XP150 and FinePix XP30) also incorporate in-built GPS tagging.

As typical, some on-line reviews claim the XP series has poor image quality, and easy to scratch screen and poor water-proofing. And also as typical, some on-line reviews praise the XP series as having great image quality, tough screens and reliable water-proofing.

Models

Current
As of January 2021, FujiFilm offers a single XP model in the US market.

FinePix XP140  - 25m Waterproof, Shockproof from 1.8m, Sandproof, Freezeproof to -10 °C (-14 °F), Wireless Image Transfer via smartphone app, in-camera GPS tagging, 16MP BSI-CMOS Image Sensor with Optical Image Stabilization, 5x optical zoom (28-140mm), Burst mode button, 4K Movie and Full HD Movie (1080p) linear PCM Duophonic, Slow-mo video, ISO range up to ISO 12800

Discontinued
FinePix XP200  - 15m Waterproof, Shockproof from 2m, Sandproof, Freezeproof to -10 °C (-14 °F), Wireless Image Transfer via smartphone app, in-camera GPS tagging, 16MP CMOS Image Sensor with Optical Image Stabilization, 5x optical zoom (28-140mm), Burst mode button (10 FPS at 16MP, 60FPS at 2MP), Full HD Movie (1080i/60fps) linear PCM sound, Slow-mo video available in standard definition (480p video at 120fps, 168p video at 360fps), ISO range up to ISO 6400
FinePix XP170 - 10m Waterproof, Shockproof from 2m, Sandproof, Freezeproof to -10 °C (-14 °F), double locking battery compartment, in-camera GPS tagging, wireless photo transfers, 14MP CMOS Shift Image Stabilization, 5x optical zoom (28-140mm), 10fps, Full HD 30p with monoaural sound and can take video while zooming
FinePix XP150 - 10m Waterproof, Shockproof from 2m, Sandproof, Freezeproof to -10 °C, double locking battery compartment, in-camera GPS tagging
FinePix XP130  - 20m Waterproof, Shockproof from 1.75m, Sandproof, Freezeproof to -10 °C, double locking battery compartment, 16MP CMOS Image Sensor
FinePix XP120 
FinePix XP100 - 10m Waterproof, Shockproof from 2m, Sandproof, Freezeproof to -10 °C, double locking battery compartment
FinePix XP80  - 15m Waterproof, Shockproof from 1.75m
FinePix XP75 - 10m Waterproof, Shockproof from 1.5m, Sandproof, Freezeproof to -10 °C, double locking battery compartment, 16MP CMOS Image Sensor
FinePix XP70 
FinePix XP50 - 5m Waterproof, Shockproof from 1.5m, Sandproof, Freezeproof to -10 °C, double locking battery compartment
FinePix XP55 - 5m Waterproof, Shockproof from 1.5m, Sandproof, Freezeproof to -10 °C, double locking battery compartment
FinePix XP30 - 5m Waterproof, Shockproof from 1.5m, Sandproof, Freezeproof to -10 °C, in-camera GPS 
FinePix XP20 - 5m Waterproof, Shockproof from 1.5m, Sandproof, Freezeproof to -10 °C
FinePix XP10 - 3m Waterproof, Shockproof from 1m, Sandproof, Freezeproof to -10 °C

See also 
 Fujifilm FinePix
 Fujifilm cameras
 Fujifilm

References

XP-series